Joseph Wardell (July 12, 1909 – July 3, 1993), known professionally as Joe DeRita, was an American actor and comedian, who is best known for his stint as a member of The Three Stooges in the persona of Curly Joe DeRita.

Early life
DeRita was born into a show-business family in Philadelphia, Pennsylvania, the son of Florenz (DeRita) and Frank Wardell, and of French-Canadian and English ancestry. He was the youngest of 5 brothers. Wardell's father was a stage technician, his mother a professional stage dancer, and the three often acted on stage together from his early childhood. Taking his mother's maiden name, DeRita, the actor joined the burlesque circuit during the 1920s, gaining fame as a comedian.  During World War II, DeRita joined the USO, performing throughout Britain,  France, and the Pacific with such celebrities as Bing Crosby and Randolph Scott. In the 1944 comedy film The Doughgirls, about the housing shortage in wartime Washington, D.C., he had an uncredited role as "the Stranger", a bewildered man who repeatedly showed up in scenes looking for a place to sleep.

Career

Joe DeRita short subjects 

In 1946, DeRita was hired by Columbia Pictures Short Subjects Division head/director Jules White to star in his own series of comedies. The first effort, Slappily Married, was released under the studio's All-Star Comedy series. The three remaining entries—The Good Bad Egg, Wedlock Deadlock (both 1947) and Jitter Bughouse (1948)—billed DeRita as the headliner. Regarding his Columbia shorts series, DeRita said, "My comedy in those scripts was limited to getting hit on the head with something, then going over to my screen wife to say, 'Honey, don't leave me!' For this kind of comedy material, you could have gotten a busboy to do it and it would have been just as funny." After his contract with Columbia ended, DeRita returned to burlesque and recorded a risque LP in 1950 called Burlesque Uncensored.

Larry, Moe and Curly Joe 
When Shemp Howard died suddenly of a heart attack on November 22, 1955, the Three Stooges were still making short comedies for Columbia Pictures. Shemp was succeeded by Joe Besser in 1956; both Shemp Howard and Joe Besser had starred in their own separate short subjects. Columbia eventually shut down the short-subjects department at the end of 1957, and Besser quit the act in 1958 to take care of his ailing wife. The two remaining Stooges seriously considered retirement. But Larry saw DeRita in a Las Vegas stage engagement and told Moe that DeRita would be "perfect for the third Stooge." Howard and Fine invited DeRita to join the act, and he readily accepted. At first, they had difficulty drawing an audience. But Columbia began releasing their shorts to television through their Screen Gems subsidiary, and their popularity with children put them back on top.

It was rumored that Jules White had attempted to recruit DeRita for the Three Stooges in 1955 (and even as early as 1946) because he wanted "another Curly", but that strong-willed DeRita had refused to change his act or imitate another performer, and White eventually gave up on him. DeRita himself debunked the rumor, saying that it "added a romance to the story". When he first joined the act (shortly after appearing in a dramatic role in the Gregory Peck western, The Bravados), DeRita wore his hair in a style similar to that of former Stooge Shemp Howard and did so during initial live stage performances. However, with the restored popularity of the Three Stooges shorts on TV featuring Curly Howard, it was suggested that Joe shave his head in order to look more like Curly. At first, DeRita sported a crew cut; this eventually became a fully shaven head. Because of his physical resemblance to both Curly and Joe Besser, and to avoid confusion with his predecessors, DeRita was renamed "Curly Joe".

Theatrical feature films 
The team embarked on a new series of six feature-length theatrical Three Stooges films, including  Have Rocket, Will Travel (1959), DeRita's on-screen debut with the Stooges, and Snow White and the Three Stooges (1961). Aimed primarily at children, these films rarely reached the same comedic heights as their shorts and often recycled routines and songs from the older films. Moe and Larry's ages—Moe was 62 and Larry 57 at the time of the first Curly Joe film—plus pressure from the PTA and other children's advocates, led to the toning-down of the trio's trademark violent slapstick. While DeRita's physical appearance was vaguely reminiscent of Curly, his characterization was milder and not as manic or surreal. The characterization evolved over time; early sketches featuring Curly Joe (such as a commercial for Simoniz car wax) have him effectively as a third wheel while Moe and Larry divided most of the comedy between themselves, while by the mid-1960s, Larry's role had been reduced and Curly Joe divided much of the comedy with Moe. Curly Joe also showed more backbone, even occasionally talking back to Moe, calling him "buddy boy".

Gradual decline 
Through the 1960s, DeRita remained a member of the team, participating in a full workload of television apprearances and commercials, a multiyear movie deal  until 1965, and The New Three Stooges animated cartoons series (with live-action introductions). However, Larry Fine suffered a paralyzing stroke in January 1970 (he died on January 24, 1975, at the age of 72) during the production of Kook's Tour, a pilot for a planned TV series, putting all new Stooges-related material on hold. Emil Sitka was twice named as "the middle stooge", but never got to perform with the team. Shortly after Larry's stroke, Moe, Emil, and Joe were going to appear in a movie written by Moe's grandson, but financing fell through. Before Moe's death on May 4, 1975, at age 77, the Stooges (with Sitka set to succeed the deceased Larry) had planned to film an R-rated movie called The Jet Set (later produced with the surviving members of the Ritz Brothers and released as Blazing Stewardesses).

In the very early 1970s, with Moe's blessing, DeRita attempted to form a truly "new" Three Stooges. He recruited burlesque and vaudeville veterans Mousie Garner and Frank Mitchell to replace Moe and Larry for nightclub engagements. However, their act was poorly received, thereby ending the group. Mitchell had worked with original Stooges organizer Ted Healy decades earlier in an abortive attempt to replace the Stooges after they had split from Healy, in addition to having replaced Shemp as the "third stooge" in a 1929 Broadway play. Mousie Garner had also participated in a substitute Stooges iteration after the Stooges split from Healy.

On August 30, 1983, the Three Stooges received a star on the Hollywood Walk of Fame. Joe Besser was the only Stooge to show up at the ceremony because of DeRita's illness; Stooges longtime supporting player Emil Sitka spoke for him. Sometime after the new star award, Besser eventually fell ill which led to his death from heart failure on March 1, 1988, at age 80. DeRita was the last Stooge to be born, the last to join the ensemble, and the last to die.

Personal life
DeRita was married twice. His first marriage was to a chorus girl named Bonnie Brooks (real name Esther M. Hartenstine) from July 13, 1935, until her death on September 6, 1965; they had no children. DeRita married his second wife, Jean Sullivan, the following year on December 28. Sullivan's sons from a previous relationship, Earl and Robert Benjamin, control licensing rights to many deceased celebrities, including the Three Stooges, through C3 Entertainment.

DeRita was the only member of the Stooges who was not Jewish.

Death
DeRita died of pneumonia on July 3, 1993, nine days before his 84th birthday. He was residing at the Motion Picture & Television Country House and Hospital in Woodland Hills, California, at the time of his passing. He was the last surviving member of the Stooges. DeRita is interred in a grave at the Pierce Brothers Valhalla Memorial Park Cemetery in North Hollywood, California; his tombstone reads "The Last Stooge", as he outlived Joe Besser by five years and 4 months.

Legacy

Although DeRita enjoyed working with Moe and Larry and made a living doing it, he was not a fan of the Stooges' humor. He once told an interviewer the following:

I don't think the Stooges were funny. I'm not putting you on, I'm telling the truth—they were physical, but they just didn't have any humor about them. Take, for instance, Laurel and Hardy. I can watch their films and I still laugh at them and maybe I've seen them four or five times before. But when I see that pie or seltzer bottle, I know that it's not just lying around for no reason. It's going to be used for something. I was with the Stooges for 12 years and it was a very pleasant association but I just don't think they were funny.

On April 24, 2000, ABC aired a television movie about the Stooges, with actor Peter Callan (who bore an eerie resemblance to DeRita at the time) playing DeRita.

Filmography

References

External links

 
 
 

1909 births
1993 deaths
Male actors from Pennsylvania
American male film actors
American male television actors
American male voice actors
American male comedians
20th-century American comedians
American people of English descent
American people of French-Canadian descent
Burials at Valhalla Memorial Park Cemetery
Deaths from pneumonia in California
Male actors from Philadelphia
The Three Stooges members
Vaudeville performers
20th-century American male actors
American male comedy actors
Columbia Pictures contract players